Mangiferin is a glucosylxanthone (xanthonoid). This molecule is a glucoside of norathyriol.

Natural occurrences 
Mangiferin was first isolated from the leaves and bark of Mangifera indica (the mango tree). It can also be extracted from mango peels and kernels, Iris unguicularis, Anemarrhena asphodeloides rhizomes and Bombax ceiba leaves. It is also found in the genera Salacia and Cyclopia, as well as in coffee leaves and some species of Crocus.

Among the group of Asplenium hybrids known as the "Appalachian Asplenium complex", mangiferin and isomangiferin are produced only by Asplenium montanum and its hybrid descendants. The distinctive gold-orange fluorescence of these compounds under ultraviolet light has been used to aid in the chromatographic identification of hybrid Aspleniums.

Research 
Preliminary research is conducted on the potential biological properties of mangiferin, although there are no confirmed anti-disease effects or prescription drugs approved, as of 2019.

See also 
Euxanthic acid

References 

Xanthonoids
C-glycoside natural phenols